Sir Robert Geffrye (also spelled Geffrey) (1613–1703) was an English merchant, slave trader, and Lord Mayor of London in 1685.

Life 
Geffrye was born to poor parents at Landrake, near Saltash, Cornwall, and moved to London, where he became an eminent East India merchant, with his house on Lime Street. He was Master of the Worshipful Company of Ironmongers, knighted in 1673, appointed a Sheriff of London in 1674 and elected Lord Mayor of London in 1685.

He was elected president of Bridewell and Bethlehem Hospitals in March 1692–3. He was a significant trader in tobacco. Part of Geffrye's investment was in the Atlantic slave trade, and he had partial ownership of a slave ship, the China Merchant.

He married Priscilla, daughter of Luke Cropley, a London merchant, but had no children.

On his death he left about £10,000 divided in legacies to friends, relatives, hospitals, and clergymen's widows, and in establishing certain trusts under the charge of the company of Ironmongers. A service was to be provided twice daily in the church of St. Dionis Backchurch, a school was to be maintained at Landrake, and the poor of St. Erney and Landrake to be relieved.

The remainder was dedicated to 14 almshouses, mainly for widows of ironmongers, which were constructed in 1715 in Shoreditch. Those buildings were sold in 1910, and now house the Museum of the Home (formerly the Geffrye Museum), which has displays of domestic life from 1600 to the present day.

New almshouses were built at Mottingham in Kent, again sold in 1972, to the Greater London Council.  
His Trust now has two almshouses in Hampshire, at Hook built in 1976 and enlarged in 1987 and one at Basingstoke that opened in 1984. They give sheltered housing to 125 retired people of limited means. There is also a Sir Robert Geffery's School in his native village of Landrake.

References

External links

 

1613 births
1703 deaths
17th-century lord mayors of London
British East India Company people
British slave owners
History of Cornwall
Knights Bachelor
Masters of the Worshipful Company of Ironmongers
People from Landrake
Politicians from Cornwall
Sheriffs of the City of London